The Anatolian Ringbeater is a breed of fancy pigeon. Anatolian Ringbeaters, along with other varieties of domesticated pigeons, are all descendants from the rock pigeon (Columba livia).

See also 
List of pigeon breeds

Pigeon breeds

References